Meigs County is a county located in the U.S. state of Ohio. As of the 2020 census, the population was 22,210. Its county seat is Pomeroy. The county is named for Return J. Meigs Jr., the fourth Governor of Ohio.

Geography
The Ohio River forms the eastern and southern boundaries of the county, the other side of which is located in West Virginia.

Meigs County lies in the Appalachian Plateau physiographic region of the Appalachian Mountains.  The landscape is considered to be anywhere from gently rolling to rugged, typical of a dissected plateau.  Elevations range from  asl (above sea level) in the southwest to about  asl in the far south central part of the county along the Ohio River. The majority of Meigs County is drained by two subwatersheds of the Ohio River, Shade River and Leading Creek.  Another stream of note is Raccoon Creek, which flows through a small area of the northwestern corner of the county.

Coal mining, both strip and underground, has been an important industry in Meigs County since the late 19th century, although mining of all types largely ceased by the 1990s.  The effects of mining are still readily seen on the landscape today.  Features such as high walls, spoil piles, and irregular topography are still prevalent.  Many tributaries in the Leading Creek basin are plagued by acid mine drainage and sedimentation.

In 2009, Gatling, Ohio LLC invested $75 million to open a new coal mine and coal prep plant near Racine. It is capable of employing 120 to 150 miners, and is capable of producing 3.5 million marketable tons of coal per year.

Climate
Meigs County's climate is considered humid continental, with warm to hot, humid summers and cool to cold, wet winters.  Precipitation averages 41" annually, spread evenly throughout the year.  High July temperatures average in the upper 80s F, while lows average in the low to mid 60s F.  Temperatures above 90* F in the summer are common.  January highs average about 40* F, with lows in the lower 20s.  Temperatures around or even below 0* F occur during most winters.  Snowfall averages 20–25", falling between late November and the first week of April.

The Ohio River creates a microclimate in its valley where temperatures tend to be moderated by the river, hence resulting in longer growing seasons compared to the rest of the county.  Other microclimates, known as frost hollows or frost pockets, exist throughout the county in small isolated valleys.  Nocturnal temperatures are often several degrees colder than the surrounding terrain.

Adjacent counties
 Athens County (north)
 Wood County, West Virginia (northeast)
 Jackson County, West Virginia (east)
 Mason County, West Virginia (southeast)
 Gallia County (southwest)
 Vinton County (west)

State protected areas
 Forked Run State Park
 Shade River State Forest

Demographics

Census-designated place
 Tuppers Plains

2000 census
As of the census of 2000, there were 23,072 people, 9,234 households, and 6,574 families living in the county. The population density was 54 people per square mile (21/km2). There were 10,782 housing units at an average density of 25 per square mile (10/km2). The racial makeup of the county was 97.73% White, 0.69% Black or African American, 0.27% Native American, 0.10% Asian, 0.25% from other races, and 0.96% from two or more races. 0.60% of the population were Hispanic or Latino of any race.

There were 9,234 households, out of which 31.20% had children under the age of 18 living with them, 56.90% were married couples living together, 10.00% had a female householder with no husband present, and 28.80% were non-families. 25.00% of all households were made up of individuals, and 11.70% had someone living alone who was 65 years of age or older. The average household size was 2.47 and the average family size was 2.94.

In the county, the population was spread out, with 23.90% under the age of 18, 8.40% from 18 to 24, 27.70% from 25 to 44, 25.20% from 45 to 64, and 14.80% who were 65 years of age or older. The median age was 39 years. For every 100 females there were 94.70 males. For every 100 females age 18 and over, there were 92.80 males.

The median income for a household in the county was $27,287, and the median income for a family was $33,071. Males had a median income of $30,821 versus $19,621 for females. The per capita income for the county was $13,848. About 14.30% of families and 19.80% of the population were below the poverty line, including 26.30% of those under age 18 and 14.50% of those age 65 or over.

2010 census
As of the 2010 United States Census, there were 23,770 people, 9,557 households, and 6,698 families living in the county. The racial makeup of the county was 97.4% white, 0.9% black or African American, 0.2% Asian, 0.2% American Indian, 0.1% from other races, and 1.2% from two or more races. Those of Hispanic or Latino origin made up 0.5% of the population. In terms of ancestry, 25.1% were German, 14.3% were Irish, 13.9% were American, and 9.6% were English.

Of the 9,557 households, 31.4% had children under the age of 18 living with them, 52.6% were married couples living together, 11.5% had a female householder with no husband present, 29.9% were non-families, and 25.3% of all households were made up of individuals. The average household size was 2.46 and the average family size was 2.91. The median age was 41.2 years.

The median income for a household in the county was $33,407 and the median income for a family was $42,653. Males had a median income of $41,850 versus $27,271 for females. The per capita income for the county was $18,003. About 16.7% of families and 20.8% of the population were below the poverty line, including 31.9% of those under age 18 and 12.3% of those age 65 or over.

Politics
Owing to its history as a settlement of the Yankee Ohio Company of Associates, Meigs County was reliably Republican for the first century following that party's formation. Meigs County voted Republican in every Presidential election between 1856 and 1960. It was won four times by Democrats between 1964 and 1996 (although Bill Clinton who carried Meigs twice did so only with pluralities) but has become powerfully Republican again since 2000. Barack Obama reached 39% in this county despite his statewide victories in 2008 or 2012, but Donald Trump reached a record 72.8% in the county in 2016 owing to his strength in rural counties nationwide.

|}

Government

Townships

 Bedford
 Chester
 Columbia
 Lebanon
 Letart
 Olive
 Orange
 Rutland
 Salem
 Salisbury
 Scipio
 Sutton

https://web.archive.org/web/20160715023447/http://www.ohiotownships.org/township-websites

Education
 Meigs Local School District
 Eastern Local School District
 Southern Local School District

Communities

Villages
 Middleport
 Pomeroy (county seat)
 Racine
 Rutland
 Syracuse

Unincorporated communities

 Alfred
 Antiquity
 Apple Grove
 Carletonville
 Carpenter
 Chester
 Darwin
 Harrisonville
 Kingsbury
 Langsville
 Letart Falls
 Long Bottom
 Meigs
 Minersville
 Portland
 Reedsville
 Salem Center
 Silver Run
 Spiller
 Success
 Welsh

Notable natives and residents

 Nelson Story Sr. was born in Burlingham, Meigs County, Ohio in 1838.

 Mike Bartrum, an NFL long snapper/tight end
 Ambrose Bierce, a journalist and short story writer, best known for "An Occurrence at Owl Creek Bridge".
 James Edwin Campbell, a poet, writer and educator
 David L. "Dave" Diles, a former American sports broadcaster and journalist
 Norman "Kid" Elberfeld, a Major League Baseball shortstop and manager
 William P. Halliday, steamboat captain, businessman, and railroad executive.
 Ralston B. (Rollie) Hemsley, Major League Baseball catcher
 Samuel Dana Horton, a bimetallism writer
 Reverend Fr. John Joseph Jessing, founder of the Pontifical College Josephinum in Columbus, Ohio
 Benny Kauff, Major League Baseball player
 Cy Morgan, a Major League Baseball pitcher

See also
 National Register of Historic Places listings in Meigs County, Ohio

References

Further reading
 Thomas William Lewis, History of Southeastern Ohio and the Muskingum Valley, 1788-1928. In Three Volumes. Chicago: S.J. Clarke Publishing Co., 1928.

External links
 Meigs County genealogy and history

 
Appalachian Ohio
Counties of Appalachia
Ohio counties on the Ohio River
1819 establishments in Ohio
Populated places established in 1819